William, Bill or Billy Abbott may refer to:

William Abbot (1790–1843), English actor and theatrical impresario
William Abbott (Australian politician) (1844–1924), Australian political figure; represented Electoral district of Upper Hunter 1889 to 1891
William Abbott (cricketer) (1856–1935), English cricketer
William Abbott (footballer) (before 1876–after 1893), English outside-left
William Abbott (Newfoundland politician) (1888–1974), Newfoundland merchant and politician
William Alexander Abbott (1897–1974), birth name of American vaudeville and film actor Bud Abbott, of Abbott and Costello
William Hawkins Abbott (1819–1901), American oil producer and trader 
William J. Abbott (born 1962), American businessman and CEO of Great American Media
William L. Abbott (1861–1951), American mechanical engineer
William Louis Abbott (1860–1936), American physician and philanthropist
William Osler Abbott (1902–1943), American physician noted as co-developer of Miller-Abbott tube
Bill Abbott Jr. (born 1954), Canadian Olympic sailor and boatbuilder
Bill Abbott Sr., Canadian sailor and boatbuilder, notable in the soling class
Billy Abbott, a character on the American daytime soap opera The Young and the Restless

See also
William Abbot (1790–1843), English stage actor
William Abbot (martyr) (before 1576–1596), English Catholic martyr, executed along with William Knight
William Abbot (politician) (fl. 1437), English politician
William Wright Abbot, American archivist and historian
William Abbotts (1736–1805), English landowner, co-founder of "Original Baths" 

Abbott (surname)